1983–1991 is a four-CD box set of material by supergroup This Mortal Coil, released on March 30, 1993 on the 4AD label. The box set was released only in the United States, and was distributed by Warner Bros. Records, with whom 4AD maintained a distribution deal at the time.  This marked the first domestic American release for most of the band's output, as only the debut album, It'll End in Tears, had been released in the United States previously.

The box set contains all three of the band's LPs, presented in their original form, with no bonus tracks or extra material.  The fourth CD is entitled Original Versions, and features 21 of the original recordings of many songs the band covered.

The box set was designed by 4AD design associates V23, and is dedicated to His Name Is Alive frontman Warren Defever.

Track listing
Disc one It'll End in Tears
Disc two Filigree & Shadow
Disc three Blood
Disc four

References

1993 compilation albums
4AD compilation albums
This Mortal Coil compilation albums
Albums produced by Ivo Watts-Russell
Albums produced by John Fryer (producer)
Covers albums